Lady and Gent is a 1932 American pre-Code drama film directed by Stephen Roberts for Paramount, featuring a young Charles ("Durango Kid") Starrett, Syd ("Three Mesquiteers") Saylor and an early supporting role by John Wayne.

Plot
A young boxer named Buzz Kinney, fresh out of college, is able to knock out Stag Bailey when the veteran fighter becomes cocky. His manager, Pin Streaver, is left despondent as he had bet a huge amount of money on Stag, including a large percentage of the prize money, and can't pay what he owes. When Stag's attempts to borrow the cash fails, Pin tries unsuccessfully to rob the boxing arena's safe and is killed by a security guard while escaping. Stag manages to bring Pin's body to another location and tells police that Pin apparently shot himself, so that Pin won't go down as a criminal.

Pin's school-aged son Ted shows up, and Stag and his girlfriend Puff help raise the boy, while trying to dissuade him from a career in boxing. Later in the film, Buzz Kinney shows up in a bar, badly beaten in a fight, with a broken nose and a cauliflower ear. He insults Puff, and Stag takes him out to the kitchen and punches him out. Stag and Puff get married so they can legally adopt Ted, and they talk the boy into going to college instead of being a prizefighter.

Cast
 George Bancroft as Stag Bailey
 Wynne Gibson as Puff Rogers
 Charles Starrett as Ted Streaver
 James Gleason as Pin Streaver
 John Wayne as Buzz Kinney
 Morgan Wallace as Cash Enright
 James Crane as McSweeley
 William Halligan as Doc Hayes
 Joyce Compton as Betty
 Frank McGlynn Sr. as Principal
 Charley Grapewin as Grocer
 Lew Kelly as Coroner
 Syd Saylor as Joe

See also
 John Wayne filmography

References

External links

1932 films
1932 drama films
American drama films
American black-and-white films
Films directed by Stephen Roberts
Paramount Pictures films
1930s English-language films
1930s American films